"Better Together" is a song by Australian singer Hayden James featuring Australian producer Running Touch. It was released on 2 November 2018 as the third single from James' debut studio album Between Us (2019). The song has peaked at number 63 on the ARIA Singles Chart. James told Ben and Liam on Triple J: "It's about holding on to someone that's special."

At the APRA Music Awards of 2020, "Better Together" won the Most Performed Dance Work of the Year.

Critical reception
Hayden Davies from PileRats said "It's a summery sun-soaked anthem with a bright house backbone, combining Hayden James' signature pop-house pulse with Running Touch's masterful vocal, which adds a sensual, pop-centric twist to the single's masterful sound."

Track listing
Digital download
 "Better Together" – 3:56

Digital download
 "Better Together"  (Happiness is Wealth Disco remix) – 6:09

Digital download
 "Better Together" (Offaiah remix) - 6:55
 "Better Together" (Offaiah remix radio edit) - 3:33

Charts

Weekly charts

Year-end charts

References

2018 singles
2018 songs
Hayden James songs
APRA Award winners
Running Touch songs
Songs written by Hayden James
Songs written by Running Touch